Worakorn Wichanarong (born June 23, 1966) is a Thai football coach and former footballer.

References

http://int.soccerway.com/coaches/worakorn-wichanarong/447802/

1966 births
Living people
Worakorn Wichanarong
Worakorn Wichanarong
Worakorn Wichanarong
Worakorn Wichanarong
Association football forwards
Worakorn Wichanarong
Worakorn Wichanarong